Ben Cooper (September 30, 1933 – February 24, 2020) was an American actor of film and television, who won a Golden Boot Award in 2005 for his work in westerns.

Stage
Cooper appeared on Broadway in Life With Father (1939). He debuted in the role of Harlan at age 9; before the play performances ended in 1943, Cooper had grown enough to play Whitney.

Radio
Cooper acted in thirty-four radio serials, many of them soap operas, in the era of old-time radio.

Film and television career
Cooper's earliest credited screen appearance was as an eighteen-year-old in 1952–1953 on the Armstrong Circle Theatre, then on NBC, in the two episodes "The Commandant's Clock" and "Changing Dream". Thereafter, he appeared in numerous films with  Republic Pictures such as Thunderbirds, Johnny Guitar, The Last Command, Duel at Apache Wells (1956), and other films such as The Rose Tattoo. 

Cooper began appearing on dozens of television westerns. He was cast as Clint Harding, a young man intent on murdering his father, in the 1956 episode, "Vengeance Canyon" on Dick Powell's Zane Grey Theatre. Walter Brennan and Sheb Wooley played outlaws, Joe and Brock, respectively, whom Clint encountered on the trail. Joe tries to convince Clint that vengeance is unproductive. 

He appeared in Tales of Wells Fargo, Wagon Train, Gunsmoke (as “Pitt”, a semi-outlaw trying to go straight and become a Doctor with “Doc Adam’s” help in S7E11’s “Apprentice Doc”), Bonanza, and Rawhide. He unsuccessfully tested in 1962 for the role of Steve Hill on NBC's 90-minute western television series, The Virginian. He played murderer Frank Wells in the 1961 Perry Mason episode "The Case of the Impatient Partner," Davis Crane in the 1962 episode "The Case of the Promoter's Pillbox," and James Grove in the 1962 episode "The Case of the Polka Dot Pony." He also played murderer Clyde Jasper in the 1965 Perry Mason episode "The Case of the Mischievous Doll".

Personal life
Cooper was a native of Hartford, Connecticut, then resided in the Greater Los Angeles Area. He served in the US Army.

After he was diagnosed with dementia, he moved to a memory care facility in Memphis, Tennessee, in 2017 to be near his family; he died there on February 24, 2020, at the age of 86. He had two daughters by his late wife Pamela R. Cooper.

Cooper supported Barry Goldwater in the 1964 United States presidential election.

Quotes

Filmography

Film appearances

Side Street (1950) - Young Man at Cleaners (uncredited)
Thunderbirds (1952) - Calvin Jones
Woman They Almost Lynched (1953) - Jesse James
A Perilous Journey (1953) - Sam
Sea of Lost Ships (1953) - 3rd Plane Crewman
Flight Nurse (1953) - Pfc. Marvin Judd
Outlaw's Son (1953) - Jeff Blaine
Johnny Guitar (1954) - Turkey Ralston
The Outcast (1954) - The Kid
Hell's Outpost (1954) - Alec Bacchione
The Eternal Sea (1955) - Seaman P.J. 'Zuggy' Zugbaum
The Last Command (1955) - Jeb Lacey
Headline Hunters (1955) - David Flynn
The Rose Tattoo (1955) - Seaman Jack Hunter
The Fighting Chance (1955) - Mike Gargan
A Strange Adventure (1956) - Harold Norton
Rebel in Town (1956) - Gray Mason
Duel at Apache Wells (1957) - Johnny Shattuck
Outlaw's Son (1957) - Jeff Blaine
Chartroose Caboose (1960) - Dub Dawson
Gunfight at Comanche Creek (1963) - Carter
The Raiders (1963) - Tom King
Arizona Raiders (1965) - Willie Martin
Waco (1966) - Scotty Moore
Red Tomahawk (1967) - Lt. Drake
The Fastest Guitar Alive (1967) - Rink
Support Your Local Gunfighter (1971) - Colorado
One More Train to Rob (1971) - First Deputy
The Sky's the Limit (1975) - Hank
Lightning Jack (1994) - Shopkeeper in Bank

Television appearances
Cooper was a notable performer in many television westerns. Cooper also appeared in television pilots for Command (1958), The Reno Brothers (1960), and The Freebooters (1967). These performances include appearances in the following television westerns:

One Step Beyond (1959) - Ronnie Watson
Tales of Wells Fargo (1959) - Matthew Land
Wichita Town (1959) - Tom Warren
Johnny Ringo (1960) - Mike Reno
Wagon Train (1959-1960) - Tom Tuckett/Steve Campden II
Zane Grey Theater (1956-1960) - Sandy/Darryl Thompson/Sam Duskin Jr./Clint Harding
Stagecoach West (1960) - Jeremy Boone
The Westerner (1960) - Cal Davis
The Twilight Zone (1961) - Dauger 
The Rifleman (1961) - Simon Lee
Bonanza (1960-1961) - Johnny Lightly/Sam Kirby 
Gunsmoke (1961-1965) - Pitt Campbell/Breck Taylor
Perry Mason (1961-1965) - Various Roles
Laramie (1962) - Johnny Hartley/Sandy Catlin
Combat! (1963-1965) - Corporal Cross/Willy Kleve
Rawhide (1964) - Clell Miller
The Time Tunnel (1966) - Nazarro
Death Valley Days (1969) - Jason Tugwell 
The Virginian (1970) - Jason
Kung Fu (1974) - Goodnight
B. J. and the Bear (1979) - Waverly
The Misadventures of Sheriff Lobo (1979-1980) - Waverly
Who's The Boss (1984) - Truth In Dating 
Dallas (1985) - Mr. Parrish
Kung Fu: The Legend Continues (1995) - Sheriff Dowd

References

External links

 
 
 

1933 births
2020 deaths
American male film actors
American male television actors
American male radio actors
Columbia University alumni
Male actors from Hartford, Connecticut
People from Greater Los Angeles
Western (genre) television actors
20th-century American male actors